"The Happy Elf" is a holiday song with music and lyrics by Harry Connick Jr.

It was first released on Connick's album Harry for the Holidays, which became the best selling Christmas album of 2003. When asked about the songs on the album, Connick described "The Happy Elf" as a "kids’ song", about "how cool it would be to work in Santa’s shop". It was also recorded for the Harry For The Holidays television special/DVD.

The song became the origin of an animated Christmas TV special, also named The Happy Elf, which aired on NBC in 2005, and was released on DVD the same year. An animated music video of the song became available on the film's official website in 2005.

"The Happy Elf" reached #35 on the singles charts (adult contemporary) in 2005.

References

2003 songs
American Christmas songs
Harry Connick Jr. songs
Songs written by Harry Connick Jr.